The following is a list of notable deaths in April 1994.

Entries for each day are listed alphabetically by surname. A typical entry lists information in the following sequence:
 Name, age, country of citizenship at birth, subsequent country of citizenship (if applicable), reason for notability, cause of death (if known), and reference.

April 1994

1
John Chase, 87, American ice hockey player and coach.
Robert Doisneau, 81, French photographer.
John McMullan, 60, American gridiron football player.
Thomas Head Raddall, 90, Canadian writer.
Netty Simons, 80, American pianist, music editor, and composer.
Gennady Voronov, 83, Soviet/Russian statesman.

2
Irene Baker, 92, American politician.
Betty Furness, 78,  American actress, consumer advocate, and commentator.
Raymond Z. Gallun, 83, American science fiction writer.
Rowland Greenberg, 73, Norwegian jazz trumpeter.
Edward Vissers, 81, Belgian road bicycle racer.

3
Agostinho da Silva, 88, Portuguese philosopher, essayist, and writer.
Tom Hamilton, 88, American football player, coach, and naval aviator.
Beverly Johnson, 46, American rock climber and adventurer, helicopter crash.
Chad Kinch, 35, American basketball player, AIDS-related complications.
Jérôme Lejeune, 67, French pediatrician and geneticist, cancer.
Aharon Remez, 74, Israeli Air Force commander, politician and diplomat.
Willis A. Trafton Jr., 76, American lawyer and politician.
Armand Vetulani, 84, Polish art historian and educator, tumor.
Frank Wells, 62, American businessman and president of The Walt Disney Company, helicopter crash.

4
Pippo Barzizza, 91, Italian composer, arranger, conductor and music director.
Luther Cressman, 96, American archaeologist.
André Derrien, 98, French sailor.
Kurt Meisel, 81, Austrian actor and film director.
Gabriella Mészáros, 80, Hungarian gymnast and Olympian.
Ginny Simms, 80, American singer and film actress.
Valentin Stănescu, 71, Romanian football manager.
Jean-Pierre Weisgerber, 89, Luxembourgian football player.

5
Ada Carrasco, 81, Mexican actress, heart attack.
Kurt Cobain, 27, American singer, musician, and songwriter, suicide.
Eduardo Jiménez de Aréchaga, 75, Uruguayan jurist, traffic collision.
Bobby Hofman, 68, American baseball player and coach, cancer.
Otari Kvantrishvili, 46, Georgian mafia boss, homicide.
Charles Newton, 77, American gridiron football player.
Arthur Vere Harvey, Baron Harvey of Prestbury, 88, British Royal Air Force officer and a politician.
Marlon Riggs, 37, American filmmaker, poet, and gay rights activist, AIDS-related complications.
Ghulam Fareed Sabri, 64, Pakistani qawwali singer.
Roy Smeck, 94, American musician.
André Tchelistcheff, 92, American winemaker.

6
Klaus Bodinger, 61, German swimmer.
Dick Cary, 77, American jazz trumpeter, composer and arranger.
Shekhar Chatterjee, 70, Indian actor and film director.
Sheck Exley, 45, American cave diver, diving accident.
Juvénal Habyarimana, 57, Rwandan politician and military officer, assassinated.
Catherine Lombard, 28, French freestyle skier, AIDS-related complications.
Patricia Ann McGee, 67, Native American tribal leader.
Kahnu Charan Mohanty, 87, Indian novelist.
Cyprien Ntaryamira, 39, Burundian politician, assassinated.
Cuthbert Peacocke, 90, Irish Anglican bishop.
Goody Rosen, 81, Canadian baseball player.
Paola Tovaglia, 28, Italian children's television presenter, brain cancer.

7
Harry Adaskin, 92, Canadian violinist, academic, and radio broadcaster.
Lee Brilleaux, 41, English R&B singer and musician, lymphoma.
Bill Dickinson, 77, Scottish rugby player and coach.
Ștefan Dobay, 84, Romanian football player.
François de Grossouvre, 76, French politician, suicide by gunshot.
Cecil Gould, 75, British art historian and curator, brain cancer.
Albert Guðmundsson, 70, Icelandic football player and politician.
Ramesh Chandra Jha, 65, Indian poet, novelist and freedom fighter.
Cesar Legaspi, 77, Filipino painter, prostate cancer.
Golo Mann, 85, German historian and essayist.
Sigmund Ruud, 86, Norwegian ski jumper.
Agathe Uwilingiyimana, 40, Prime Minister of Rwanda, murdered.

8
Irene Eisinger, 90, German-British opera singer and film actress.
François Rozet, 95, French-Canadian actor.
Leonard Small, 88, Scottish minister and author.
Dada Vujasinović, 30, Serbian journalist and reporter.
Åke Wallenquist, 90, Swedish astronomer.

9
M. S. Fernando, 58, Sri Lankan singer and musician.
Marcel Ichac, 87, French alpinist, explorer, photographer and film director.
Mieczysław Maneli, 72, Polish lawyer, diplomat and academic.
Theodore D. Mann, 71, American politician.
Hal Missingham, 87, Australian artist and watercolourist.
Anthony E. Pratt, 90, English musician and inventor of board game Cluedo, Alzheimer's disease.
Paul Păun, 78, Romanian-Israeli avant-garde poet and visual artist.
Keith Watson, 59, British comics artist, cancer.

10
Viktor Afanasyev, 71, Soviet/Russian journalist and professor of philosophy.
Lewis Billups, 30, American gridiron football player, car crash.
Reinaldo Gorno, 75, Argentine long-distance runner and Olympian.
Sam B. Hall, 70, American lawyer, politician, and judge.
John O'Brien, 33, American author (Leaving Las Vegas), suicide.
V. G. W. Ratnayake, 85, Sri Lankan politician.

11
Wesley Barry, 86, American actor, director, and producer.
John Block, 64, Dutch aviation pioneer.
Sticks Evans, 71, American drummer, percussionist, arranger and musical director.
Matthew Feldman, 75, American politician.
Chu Tunan, 95, Chinese politician.

12
Elissa Aalto, 71, Finnish architect.
Bob Cryer, 59, English politician, traffic collision.
Daniel Levinson, 73, American psychologist.
Branko Mikulić, 65, Yugoslavian statesman, lung cancer.
Pamela Mitford, 86, English socialite and one of the Mitford sisters.
Joseph Nelis, 77, Belgian football player.
Frank V. Phillips, 82, American cinematographer (The Black Hole, Pete's Dragon, The Apple Dumpling Gang).

13
Kurt Aland, 79, German theologian and biblical scholar.
Jørgen Buckhøj, 59, Danish actor
Piet Engels, 70, American politician.
Robert K. A. Gardiner, 79, Ghanaian government official, university professor, and economist.
Claude Heymann, 86, French screenwriter and film director.
Rudolf Hrušínský, 73, Czech actor and director.
Nikolai Kryuchkov, 83, Soviet/Russian film actor.
John Marriott, 81, Australian politician.
Bert Ramelson, 84, British communist politician.
Mika Tiivola, 71, Finnish businessman.

14
Bobby Gurney, 86, English football player and manager.
Evelyn King, 86, British politician.
Salimuzzaman Siddiqui, 96, Pakistani organic chemist, painter, and poet.
Hugh Springer, 80, Barbados politician and fourth Governor-general of Barbados.

15
István Boros, 84, Male Hungarian international table tennis player.
Walter Clegg, 73, British Conservative politician.
John Curry, 44, British figure skater, heart attack.
Vardges Petrosyan, 61, Armenian writer of fiction and drama, homicide.

16
József Albert, 81, Hungarian football player.
Renu Chakravartty, 76, Indian politician and leader of Communist Party of India.
Ralph Ellison, 80, American novelist, literary critic, and scholar, pancreatic cancer.
Leslie Flint, 83, British psychic medium.
John McLiam, 76, Canadian actor (Cool Hand Luke, In Cold Blood, First Blood), Parkinson's disease.
Victor Popov, 56, Russian theoretical physicist.
José Ramón Sauto, 81, Mexican football player.
Samuel Selvon, 70, Trinidad and Tobago writer, respiratory failure.
Allan "Whitey" Snyder, 79, American make-up artist.
Ron Vawter, 45, American actor (The Silence of the Lambs, Philadelphia, Sex, Lies, and Videotape), heart attack.

17
Robert Legget, 89, Canadian civil engineer, historian and writer.
Roger Sperry, 80, American neuropsychologist, neurobiologist and Nobel prize laureate.
Walter Wilson, 80, American baseball player.
Manno Wolf-Ferrari, 82, Italian conductor.

18
Tamás Aczél, 72, Hungarian poet, writer, and journalist.
Dener, 23, Brazilian football player and manager, traffic collision.
Ken Oosterbroek, 32, South African photojournalist, shot.
Ruggero Orlando, 86, Italian journalist, writer and politician.
Bill Rexford, 67, American racecar driver.

19
Taisia Afonina, 80, Soviet/Russian painter and watercolorist.
Michael Carreras, 66, British film producer and director.
Larry Davis, 57, American blues musician, cancer.
Rodolfo de Álzaga, 63, Argentine racing driver.
Tommy McCue, 80, English rugby player.
Rolf Paetz, 71, German football player.

20
Anna Molka Ahmed, 76, Pakistani artist.
Jean Carmet, 73, French actor, heart attack.
Miguel Diab, 73, Uruguayan basketball player.
Frederick Feary, 82, American boxer.
Frederick Fortune, 73, American bobsledder and Olympian.
Rosalie Gicanda, 66, Rwandan queen, murdered.
Jean Ousset, 79, French catholic ideologist, stroke.
Qəmər Salamzadə, 85, Azerbaijani and Soviet film director and screenwriter.
Dennis Cleveland Stewart, 46, American actor (Grease) and dancer, AIDS-related disease.

21
Robert Bonnett, 77, Australian politician.
Darryl Carlton, 40, American gridiron football player.
Clyde Crabtree, 88, American gridiron football player.
Howard Barraclough Fell, 76, New Zealand zoologist.
Ruth Hiatt, 88, American actress.
Edmond Keosayan, 57, Armenian and Soviet film director and musician, laryngeal cancer.
Raúl Soldi, 89, Argentine painter and production designer.

22
Charles Reginald Dodwell, 72, British art historian.
Oretta Fiume, 74, Italian film actress.
Karl Hess, 70, American speechwriter and author.
Richard Nixon, 81, 37th President of the United States, stroke.

23
Lucho Bermúdez, 82, Colombian musician, DJ, and performer, heart attack.
Cécile Dreesmann, 74, Dutch textile artist.
Zhu Futang, 94, Chinese pediatrician.
Jimmy Izquierdo, 31, Ecuadorian football player, traffic collision.
Flavio Mogherini, 72, Italian production designer, art director and film director.

24
Donald J. Atwood Jr., 69, American engineer and Deputy Secretary of Defense.
Edwin Adams Davis, 90, American historian.
Lawren P. Harris, 83, Canadian visual artist and art educator.
S. L. Kirloskar, 90, Indian businessman.
Margot Trooger, 70, German film actress.

25
Georgios Gennimatas, 54, Greek politician, lung cancer.
Gordon Jones, 64, American Major League Baseball player.
Mike Kreevich, 85, American baseball player.
David Langton, 82, British actor.
Giovanni Pettinati, 68, Italian racing cyclist.
Roberto Scarone, 76, Uruguayan football player and manager, Alzheimer's disease.

26
Andrey Ayzderdzis, 35, Russian politician, homicide.
Rostam Bastuni, 71, Israeli politician and journalist.
Mas Oyama, 70, Korean-Japanese karate master, lung cancer.
Bob Pike, 60, Australian politician.
Manuel Enríquez Salazar, 67, Mexican composer, violinist and pedagogue.
Zein al-Sharaf Talal, 77, Queen of Jordan as the wife of King Talal.
Maximilian von Edelsheim, 96, German nazi Wehrmacht general during World War II.

27
Lynne Frederick, 39, English actress (Nicholas and Alexandra, Henry VIII and His Six Wives, The Amazing Mr. Blunden).
Vasilis Goulandris, 80, Greek shipowner and art collector.
Bill Pellington, 66, American gridiron football player.
Timothy Wilson Spencer, 32, American serial killer, execution by electrocution.

28
Oleg Borisov, 64, Soviet and Russian actor, leukemia.
Robert Spencer Carr, 85, American writer of science fiction and fantasy.
Gerhard Lindemann, 97, German nazi Wehrmacht general during World War II..
John Preston, 48, American author of gay erotica, AIDS-related complications.
Berton Roueché, 84, American medical writer, suicide.

29
Marcel Bernard, 79, French tennis player.
Jimmy Darden, 71, American basketball player and coach.
Ignacio Farrés Iquino, 83, Spanish film director, screenwriter, and producer.
Russell Kirk, 75, American political theorist and writer.
Bill Quinn, 81, American actor (Archie Bunker's Place, The Birds, Star Trek V: The Final Frontier).
Sak Sutsakhan, 66, Cambodian soldier and anti-communist politician.

30
Herbert Bowden, Baron Aylestone, 89, British politician.
George Constantin, 60, Romanian actor.
Sorie Ibrahim Koroma, 64, Sierra Leonean politician and labor activist.
Roland Ratzenberger, 33, Austrian racing driver, racing accident.
Ferdinando Scarfiotti, 53, Italian art director and production designer.
Richard Scarry, 74, American children's author and illustrator, heart attack.

References 

1994-04
 04